Lynam may refer to:

Lynam, an Irish surname
Lynam (band), an American hard rock band from Birmingham, Alabama, active 2001–present